Elia Davide Ballardini (born 25 December 1991) is an Italian footballer who plays as a midfielder for Forlì in the Serie D.

His father is football coach Davide Ballardini.

Biography
Born in Stockholm, capital of Sweden, Elia Ballardini started his career at A.C. Cesena. He was signed by Bellaria – Igea Marina and A.S. Andria BAT in temporary deals. On 14 January 2013 he was signed by Virtus Entella along with Sasha Cori. In 2014 the club promoted to Serie B.

References

External links
 AIC profile (data by football.it) 
 Elia Ballardini at Footballdatabase

1991 births
Living people
Footballers from Stockholm
Italian footballers
Association football midfielders
A.C. Cesena players
S.S. Fidelis Andria 1928 players
A.C. Bellaria Igea Marina players
Carrarese Calcio players
Virtus Entella players
Santarcangelo Calcio players
Ravenna F.C. players
Forlì F.C. players
Scandicci Calcio players
Serie C players
Serie D players
Italian people of Swedish descent